NCAA Division I (D-I) is the highest level of intercollegiate athletics sanctioned by the National Collegiate Athletic Association (NCAA) in the United States, which accepts players globally. D-I schools include the major collegiate athletic powers, with large budgets, more elaborate facilities and more athletic scholarships than Divisions II and III as well as many smaller schools committed to the highest level of intercollegiate competition.

This level was previously called the University Division of the NCAA, in contrast to the lower-level College Division; these terms were replaced with numeric divisions in 1973. The University Division was renamed Division I, while the College Division was split in two; the College Division members that offered scholarships or wanted to compete against those who did became Division II, while those who did not want to offer scholarships became Division III.

For college football only, D-I schools are further divided into the Football Bowl Subdivision (FBS), the Football Championship Subdivision (FCS), and those institutions that do not have any football program. FBS teams have higher game attendance requirements and more players receiving athletic scholarships than FCS teams. The FBS is named for its series of postseason bowl games, with various polls ranking teams after the conclusion of these games, while the FCS national champion is determined by a multi-team bracket tournament.

For the 2020–21 school year, Division I contained 357 of the NCAA's 1,066 member institutions, with 130 in the Football Bowl Subdivision (FBS), 127 in the Football Championship Subdivision (FCS), and 100 non-football schools, with six additional schools in the transition from Division II to Division I. There was a moratorium on any additional movement up to D-I until 2012, after which any school that wants to move to D-I must be accepted for membership by a conference and show the NCAA it has the financial ability to support a D-I program.

D-I schools
Schools must field teams in at least seven sports for men and seven for women or six for men and eight for women, with at least two team sports for each gender. Teams that include both men and women are counted as men's sports for the purposes of sponsorship counting. Division I schools must meet minimum financial aid awards for their athletics program, and there are maximum financial aid awards for each sport that a Division I school cannot exceed. Several other NCAA sanctioned minimums and differences distinguish Division I from Divisions II and III. Members must sponsor at least one sport (not necessarily a team sport) for each sex in each playing season (fall, winter, spring), again with coeducational teams counted as men's teams for this purpose. There are contest and participant minimums for each sport, as well as scheduling criteria. For sports other than football and basketball, Division I schools must play all the minimum number of contests against Division I opponents—anything over the minimum number of games has to be 50 percent Division I. Men's and women's basketball teams have to play all but two games against Division I teams; for men, they must play one-third of all their contests in the home arena.

In addition to the schools that compete fully as D-I institutions, the NCAA allows D-II and D-III schools to classify one men's and one women's sport (other than football or basketball) as a D-I sport, as long as they sponsored those sports before the latest rules change in 2011. Also, Division II schools are eligible to compete for Division I national championships in sports that do not have a Division II national championship, and in those sports may also operate under D-I rules and scholarship limits.

FBS and FCS
For football only, Division I was further subdivided in 1978 into Division I-A (the principal football schools), Division I-AA (the other schools with football teams), and Division I (those schools not sponsoring football). In 2006, Division I-A and I-AA were renamed "Football Bowl Subdivision" (FBS) and "Football Championship Subdivision" (FCS), respectively.

FBS teams are allowed a maximum of 85 players receiving athletically based aid per year, with each player on scholarship receiving a full scholarship. FCS teams have the same 85-player limit as FBS teams, but are allowed to give aid equivalent to only 63 full scholarships. FCS teams are allowed to award partial scholarships, a practice technically allowed but essentially never used at the FBS level. FBS teams also have to meet minimum game attendance requirements (average 15,000 people in actual or paid attendance per home game), while FCS teams do not need to meet minimum attendance requirements.

Another difference is postseason play. Since 1978, FCS teams have played in an NCAA-sanctioned bracket tournament culminating in a title game, the NCAA Division I Football Championship, to determine a national champion. Meanwhile, FBS teams play in bowl games, with various polls ranking teams after the conclusion of these games, yielding a Consensus National Champion annually since 1950. Starting with the 2014 postseason, a four-team College Football Playoff has been contested, replacing a one-game championship format that had started during the 1992 postseason with the Bowl Coalition. Even so, Division I FBS football remains the only NCAA sport in which a yearly champion is not determined by an NCAA-sanctioned championship event.

Finances
Division I athletic programs generated $8.7 billion in revenue in the 2009–2010 academic year. Men's teams provided 55%, women's teams 15%, and 30% was not categorized by sex or sport. Football and men's basketball are usually a university's only profitable sports, and are called "revenue sports". From 2008 to 2012, 205 varsity teams were dropped in NCAA Division I – 72 for women and 133 for men, with men's tennis, gymnastics and wrestling hit particularly hard.

In the Football Bowl Subdivision (130 schools in 2017), between 50 and 60 percent of football and men's basketball programs generated positive revenues (above program expenses). However, in the Football Championship Subdivision (124 schools in 2017), only four percent of football and five percent of men's basketball programs generated positive revenues.

In 2012, 2% of athletic budgets were spent on equipment, uniforms and supplies for male athletes at NCAA Division I Football Bowl Subdivision school, with the median spending per-school at $742,000.

In 2014, the NCAA and the student athletes debated whether student athletes should be paid. In April, the NCAA approved students-athletes getting free unlimited meals and snacks. The NCAA stated "The adoption of the meals legislation finished a conversation that began in the Awards, Benefits, Expenses and Financial Aid Cabinet. Members have worked to find appropriate ways to ensure student-athletes get the nutrition they need without jeopardizing Pell Grants or other federal aid received by the neediest student-athletes. With their vote, members of the council said they believe loosening NCAA rules on what and when food can be provided from athletics departments is the best way to address the issue."

According to the finance section of the NCAA page, "The NCAA receives most of its annual revenue from two sources: television and marketing rights for the Division I Men’s Basketball Championship and ticket sales for all championships. That money is distributed in more than a dozen ways — almost all of which directly support NCAA schools, conferences and nearly half a million student-athletes. About 60% of the NCAA’s annual revenue — around $600 million — is annually distributed directly to Division I member schools and conferences, while more than $150 million funds Division I championships" (NCAA 2021).

Finances

Football conferences
Under NCAA regulations, all Division I conferences defined as "multisport conferences" must meet the following criteria:
 A total of at least seven active Division I members.
 Separate from the above, at least seven active Division 1 members that sponsor both men's and women's basketball.
 Sponsorship of at least 12 NCAA Division I sports.
 Minimum of six men's sports, with the following additional restrictions:
 Men's basketball is a mandatory sport, and at least seven members must sponsor that sport.
 Non-football conferences must sponsor at least two men's team sports other than basketball.
 At least six members must sponsor five men's sports other than basketball, including either football or two other team sports.
 Minimum of six women's sports, with the following additional restrictions:
 Women's basketball is a mandatory sport, with at least seven members sponsoring that sport.
 At least two other women's team sports must be sponsored.
 At least six members must sponsor five women's sports other than basketball, with at least two of those five being team sports. If a conference officially sponsors an NCAA "emerging sport" for women (as of 2020, acrobatics & tumbling, equestrianism, rugby union, triathlon, or wrestling), that sport will be counted if five members (instead of six) sponsor it.

FBS conferences
FBS conferences must meet a more stringent set of requirements for NCAA recognition than other conferences:
 A total of at least eight active FBS members.
 To be counted toward this total, a school must participate in conference play in at least six men's and eight women's sports, including men's and women's basketball, football, and at least two other women's team sports.
 Each school may count one men's and one women's sport not sponsored by its primary conference toward the above limits, as long as that sport competes in another Division I conference. The men's and women's sports so counted need not be the same sport.

† "Power Five" conferences with guaranteed berths in the New Year's Six, the bowl games associated with the College Football Playoff
‡ "Group of Five" conferences

Notes

FCS conferences

Notes

Sports

Men's team sports

Sports are ranked according to total possible scholarships (number of teams x number of scholarships per team). Scholarship numbers for head-count sports are indicated without a decimal point. Numbers for equivalency sports are indicated with a decimal point, with a trailing zero if needed.

Notes:
 The NCAA officially classifies the men's championships in volleyball and water polo as "National Collegiate" championships, that being the designation for championships that are open to members of more than one NCAA division. The ice hockey championship, however, is styled as a "Division I" championship because of the previous existence of a separate Division II championship in that sport. 
 Football — D-I football programs are divided into FBS and FCS. The 128 FBS programs can award financial aid to as many as 85 players, with each player able to receive up to a full scholarship. The 124 FCS programs can award up to the equivalent of 63 full scholarships, divided among no more than 85 individuals. Some FCS conferences restrict scholarships to a lower level or prohibit scholarships altogether. 
 Soccer — As of the next NCAA soccer season in 2023, part of the 2023–24 academic year, four of the 10 FBS conferences will not sponsor men's soccer—the Big 12, Conference USA, Mid-American Conference, and the SEC. Several other D-I conferences also do not sponsor the sport—the Big Sky, MEAC, Mountain West, Ohio Valley, Southland, and SWAC. The Sun Belt Conference is the most recent conference to add men's soccer, reinstating its league for the 2022 season after having dropped the sport after the 2020–21 academic year. Conference USA shut down its league after losing most of its men's soccer membership to the Sun Belt Conference, followed by the American Athletic Conference taking in C-USA's remaining four teams (three of which will fully join The American in 2023) as associate members for 2022. The MAC was reduced to 5 men's soccer members in the 2022 season, and shut down its league at the end of that season after being unable to find the sixth member needed to maintain its automatic NCAA tournament bid. Of its final men's soccer members, three moved that sport to the Missouri Valley Conference and one to the Big East Conference.
 Ice hockey — Almost all D-I ice hockey programs are in the Northeast, the Upper Midwest, or the Colorado Front Range. Only one D-I all-sports conference, the Big Ten, sponsors a men's hockey league. All other conferences operate as hockey-specific leagues. Of the 61 teams competing in D-I hockey in 2022–23, 22 are otherwise classified as either D-II or D-III; a number of schools from D-II play in D-I ice hockey as the NCAA no longer sponsors a championship in D-II and many have traditional/cultural fan bases that support ice hockey, and the D-III schools were "grandfathered" in to D-I through their having sponsored hockey prior to the creation of D-III.
 Lacrosse — The vast majority of D-I lacrosse programs are from the Northeast and Mid-Atlantic. Only five D-I programs are not in the Eastern Time Zone—Air Force and Denver on the Colorado Front Range, Lindenwood on the Missouri side of the St. Louis metropolitan area, Marquette in Milwaukee, and Utah.
 Volleyball — Of the traditional D-I conferences, only the Big West Conference and Northeast Conference sponsor men's volleyball, with those conferences respectively adding the sport in 2017–18 and 2022–23. Two of the other three major volleyball conferences, defined in that sport as leagues that include full Division I members, are volleyball-specific conferences; the third is the Mountain Pacific Sports Federation, a multi-sport conference that does not sponsor football or basketball. In addition to the D-I schools, 31 D-II schools are competing in the National Collegiate division in 2022–23; eight of these are members of Conference Carolinas, the first all-sports league outside Division III to sponsor the sport, and six are members of the Southern Intercollegiate Athletic Conference.
 Water Polo — The number of D-I schools sponsoring men's water polo has declined from 35 in 1987/88 to 22 in 2010/11. No school outside of California has ever made the finals of the championship, and all champions since 1998 have come from one of the four California-based Pac-12 schools.

Men's individual sports
The following table lists the men's individual D-I sports with at least 1,000 participating athletes. Sports are ranked by number of athletes.

D-I college wrestling has lost almost half of its programs since 1982.

Women's team sports

Notes
 As in the men's table above, sports are ranked in order of total possible scholarships. Numbers for head-count sports are indicated without a decimal point; those for equivalency sports are indicated with a decimal point, with a trailing zero if needed.
 Women's soccer is the fastest growing NCAA D-I women's team sport over a prolonged period, increasing from 22 teams in 1981–82 to 335 teams in 2021–22. However, in recent years, the fastest-growing has been beach volleyball, which went from 14 Division I teams in 2011–12 to 62 in 2021–22.
 † = Since the 2016–17 school year, rugby is classified by the NCAA as an "emerging sport" for women. Beach volleyball, which had previously been an "emerging sport" under the name of "sand volleyball", became an official NCAA championship sport in 2015–16.
 * = The number of scholarships are partially linked for (indoor) volleyball and beach volleyball. Schools that field both indoor and beach volleyball teams are allowed 6.0 full scholarship equivalents specifically for beach volleyball as of 2016–17, with the further limitations that (1) no player receiving aid for beach volleyball can be on the indoor volleyball roster and (2) a maximum of 14 individuals can receive aid in beach volleyball. If a school fields only a beach volleyball team, it is allowed 8.0 full scholarship equivalents for that sport, also distributed among no more than 14 individuals.

Women's individual sports
The following table lists the women's individual D-I sports with at least 1,000 participating athletes. Sports are ranked by number of athletes.

Broadcasting and revenue 
NCAA Division I schools have broadcasting contracts that showcase their more popular sports — typically football and men's basketball — on network television and in basic cable channels. These contracts can be quite lucrative, particularly for D-I schools from the biggest conferences. For example, the Big Ten conference in 2016 entered into contracts with Fox and ESPN that pay the conference $2.64 billion over six years.

The NCAA also holds certain TV contracts. For example, the NCAA's contract to show the men's basketball championship tournament (widely known as March Madness) is currently under a 14-year deal with CBS and Turner that runs from 2010 to 2024 and pays $11 billion.

For the 2014–15 fiscal year, the conferences that earned the most revenues (and that distributed the most revenues to each of their member schools) were: 
 SEC — $527 million (dispersed $33 million to each of its member schools)
 Big 10 — $449 million (dispersed $32 million each)
 Pac-12 — $439 million (dispersed $25 million each)
 ACC — $403 million (dispersed $26 million each)
 Big 12 — $268 million (dispersed $23 million each)

Scholarship limits by sport
The NCAA has limits on the total financial aid each Division I member may award in each sport that the school sponsors. It divides sports that are sponsored into two types for purposes of scholarship limitations:
 "Head-count" sports, in which the NCAA limits the total number of individuals that can receive athletic scholarships, but allows each player to receive up to a full scholarship.
 "Equivalency" sports, in which the NCAA limits the total financial aid that a school can offer in a given sport to the equivalent of a set number of full scholarships. Roster limitations may or may not apply, depending on the sport.
The term "counter" is also key to this concept. The NCAA defines a "counter" as "an individual who is receiving institutional financial aid that is countable against the aid limitations in a sport."

The number of scholarships that Division I members may award in each sport is listed below. In this table, scholarship numbers for head-count sports are indicated without a decimal point; for equivalency sports, they are listed with a decimal point, with a trailing zero if required.

Rules for multi-sport athletes
The NCAA also has rules specifying the sport in which multi-sport athletes are to be counted, with the basic rules being:
 Anyone who participates in football is counted in that sport, even if he does not receive financial aid from the football program. An exception exists for players at non-scholarship FCS programs who receive aid in another sport.
 Participants in basketball are counted in that sport, unless they also play football.
 Participants in men's ice hockey are counted in that sport, unless they also play football or basketball.
 Participants in both men's swimming and diving and men's water polo are counted in swimming and diving, unless they count in football or basketball.
 Participants in women's (indoor) volleyball are counted in that sport unless they also play basketball.
 All other multi-sport athletes are counted in whichever sport the school chooses.

Football subdivisions
Subdivisions in Division I exist only in football. In all other sports, all Division I conferences are equivalent. The subdivisions were recently given names to reflect the differing levels of football play in them.

The method by which the NCAA determines whether a school is Bowl or Championship subdivision is first by attendance numbers and then by scholarships. For attendance reporting methods, the NCAA allows schools to report either total tickets sold or the number of persons in attendance at the games. They require a minimum average of 15,000 people in attendance every other year. These numbers get posted to the NCAA statistics website for football each year. With the new rules starting in the 2006 season, the number of Bowl Subdivision schools could drop in the future if those schools are not able to pull in enough fans into the games. Additionally, 14 FCS schools had enough attendance to be moved up in 2012. Under current NCAA rules, these schools must have an invitation from an FBS conference in order to move to FBS. Three of them—Appalachian State, Georgia Southern, and Old Dominion—began FBS transitions in 2013. All had the required FBS conference invitations, with Old Dominion joining Conference USA in 2013, and Appalachian State and Georgia Southern joining the Sun Belt Conference in 2014. The difference in the postseasons in each of the subdivisions grant the FCS an advantage to have the best record in college football history, 17–0, while the FBS only allows a 15–0 record.

Football Bowl Subdivision

Division I Football Bowl Subdivision (FBS), formerly known as Division I-A, is the top level of college football. Schools in Division I FBS compete in post-season bowl games, with the champions of five conferences, along with the highest-ranked champion of the other five conferences, receiving automatic bids to the access bowls.

FBS schools are limited to a total of 85 football players receiving financial assistance. For competitive reasons, a student receiving partial scholarship counts fully against the total of 85. Nearly all FBS schools that are not on NCAA probation give 85 full scholarships.

As of the 2022 college football season, there are 130 full members of Division I FBS, plus one transitional school that is considered an FBS member for scheduling purposes. The most recent school to become a full FBS member is Liberty University, which made the transition from FCS in 2017 and 2018. The next school to become a full FBS member is James Madison University, which joined the Sun Belt Conference in 2022. Because JMU met FBS scheduling requirements (specifically five home games against FBS opposition) in 2022, it was allowed to skip the first year of the normal two-year transitional process, making it eligible for bowl games in 2023.

Since the 2016 season, all FBS conferences have been allowed to conduct a championship game that does not count against the limit of 12 regular-season contests. Under the current rules, most recently changed in advance of the 2022 season, conferences have complete freedom to determine the participants in their championship games. From 2016 to 2021, FBS rules allowed such a game to be held either (1) between the winners of each of two divisions, with each team having played a full round-robin schedule within its division, or (2) between the conference's top two teams after a full round-robin conference schedule. Before 2016, "exempt" championship games could only be held between the divisional winners of conferences that had at least 12 football teams and split into divisions. The prize is normally a specific bowl game bid for which the conference has a tie-in.

Some conferences have numbers in their names but this often has no relation to the number of member institutions in the conference. The Big Ten Conference did not formally adopt the "Big Ten" name until 1987, but unofficially used that name when it had 10 members from 1917 to 1946, and again from 1949 forward. However, it has continued to use the name even after it expanded to 11 members with the addition of Penn State in 1990, 12 with the addition of Nebraska in 2011, and 14 with the arrival of Maryland and Rutgers in 2014. The Big 12 Conference was established in 1996 with 12 members, but continues to use that name even after a number of departures and a few replacements left the conference with 10 members. On the other hand, the Pac-12 Conference has used names (official or unofficial) that have reflected the number of members since its current charter was established in 1959. The conference unofficially used "Big Five" (1959–62), "Big Six" (1962–64), and "Pacific-8" (1964–68) before officially adopting the "Pacific-8" name. The name duly changed to "Pacific-10" in 1978 with the addition of Arizona and Arizona State, and "Pac-12" (instead of "Pacific-12") in 2011 when Colorado and Utah joined. Conferences also tend to ignore their regional names when adding new schools. For example, the Pac-8/10/12 retained its "Pacific" moniker even though its four newest members (Arizona, Arizona State, Colorado, Utah) are located in the inland West, and the original Big East kept its name even after adding schools (either in all sports or for football only) located in areas traditionally considered to be in the Midwest (Cincinnati, DePaul, Marquette, Notre Dame), Upper South (Louisville, Memphis) and Southwest (Houston, SMU). The non-football conference that assumed the Big East name when the original Big East split in 2013 is another example of this phenomenon, as half of its 10 inaugural schools (Butler, Creighton, DePaul, Marquette, Xavier) are traditionally regarded as being Midwestern.

Conferences

 – "Big Five" or "Power Five" conferences with guaranteed berths in the "access bowls" associated with the College Football Playoff
 – "Group of Five" conferences

Notes

Football Championship Subdivision

The Division I Football Championship Subdivision (FCS), formerly known as Division I-AA, consists of 130 teams as of the 2022 season, with all participating in one of 14 conferences. The "I-AA" designation was dropped by the NCAA in 2006, although it is still informally and commonly used. FCS teams are limited to 63 players on scholarship (compared to 85 for FBS teams) and usually play an 11-game schedule (compared to 12 games for FBS teams). The FCS determines its national champion through an NCAA-sanctioned single-elimination bracket tournament, culminating in a title game, the NCAA Division I Football Championship. As of the 2018 season, the tournament begins with 24 teams; 10 conference champions that received automatic bids, and 14 teams selected at-large by a selection committee.

The postseason tournament traditionally begins on Thanksgiving weekend in late November. When I-AA was formed  in 1978, the playoffs included just four teams for its first three seasons, doubling to eight teams for one season in 1981. From 1982 to 1985, there was a 12-team tournament; this expanded to 16 teams in 1986. The playoffs expanded to 20 teams starting in 2010, then grew to 24 teams in 2013. Since the 2010 season, the title game is held in early January at Toyota Stadium in Frisco, Texas. From 1997 through 2009, the title game was played in December in Chattanooga, Tennessee, preceded by five seasons in Huntington, West Virginia.

Abstainers
The Football Championship Subdivision includes several conferences which do not participate in the eponymous post-season championship tournament.

The Ivy League was reclassified to I-AA (FCS) following the 1981 season, and plays a strict ten-game schedule. Although it qualifies for an automatic bid, the Ivy League has not played any postseason games at all since becoming a conference for the 1956 NCAA University Division football season, citing academic concerns. (The last college which is now an Ivy League member to play in a bowl game was Columbia in the 1934 Rose Bowl.)

The Southwestern Athletic Conference (SWAC) has its own championship game in mid-December between the champions of its East and West divisions. Also, three of its member schools traditionally do not finish their regular seasons until Thanksgiving weekend. Grambling State and Southern play each other in the Bayou Classic, and Alabama State plays Tuskegee (of Division II) in the Turkey Day Classic. SWAC teams are eligible to accept at-large bids if their schedule is not in conflict. The last SWAC team to participate in the I-AA playoffs was Jackson State in 1997; the SWAC never achieved success in the tournament, going winless in 19 games in twenty years (1978–97). It had greater success outside the conference while in Division II and the preceding College Division.

From 2006 through 2009, the Pioneer Football League and Northeast Conference champions played in the Gridiron Classic. If a league champion was invited to the national championship playoff as an at-large bid (something the Pioneer league, at least, never received), the second-place team would play in the Gridiron Classic. That game was scrapped after the 2009 season when its four-year contract ran out; this coincided with the NCAA's announcement that the Northeast Conference would get an automatic bid to the tournament starting in 2010. The Big South Conference also received an automatic bid in the same season. The Pioneer Football League earned an automatic bid beginning in 2013.

The Mid-Eastern Athletic Conference (MEAC) began abstaining from the playoffs with the 2015 season. Like the SWAC, its members are eligible for at-large bids, and the two conferences have faced off in the Celebration Bowl as an alternative postseason game since the 2015 season.

Schools in a transition period after joining the FCS from a lower division (or from the NAIA) are also ineligible for the playoffs.

Scholarships
Division I FCS schools are currently restricted to giving financial assistance amounting to 63 full scholarships. As FCS football is an "equivalency" sport (as opposed to the "head-count" status of FBS football), Championship Subdivision schools may divide their allotment into partial scholarships. However, FCS schools may only have 85 players receiving any sort of athletic financial aid for football—the same numeric limit as FBS schools. Because of competitive forces, however, a substantial number of players in Championship Subdivision programs are on full scholarships. Another difference is that FCS schools no longer have a limit on the number of new players that can be provided with financial aid in a given season, while FBS schools are limited to 25 such additions per season. Finally, FCS schools are limited to 95 individuals participating in preseason practices, as opposed to 105 at FBS schools (the three service academies that play FBS football are exempt from preseason practice player limits by NCAA rule).

A few Championship Subdivision conferences are composed of schools that offer no athletic scholarships at all, most notably the Ivy League and the Pioneer Football League (PFL), a football-only conference. The Ivy League allows no athletic scholarships at all, while the PFL consists of schools that offer scholarships in other sports but choose not to take on the expense of a scholarship football program. The Northeast Conference also sponsored non-scholarship football, but began offering a maximum of 30 full scholarship equivalents in 2006, which grew to 40 in 2011 after a later vote of the league's school presidents and athletic directors and has since increased to 45. The Patriot League only began awarding football scholarships in the 2013 season, with the first scholarships awarded only to incoming freshmen. Before the conference began its transition to scholarship football, athletes receiving scholarships in other sports were ineligible to play football for member schools. Since the completion of the transition with the 2016 season, member schools have been allowed up to 60 full scholarship equivalents.

Conferences

Notes

Division I non-football schools
Several Bowl Subdivision and Championship Subdivision conferences have member institutions that do not compete in football. Such schools are sometimes unofficially referred to as I-AAA.

The following non-football conferences have full members that sponsor football:
 The America East Conference has four football-sponsoring schools. Albany, Maine, and New Hampshire play in CAA Football, the technically separate football league of the Colonial Athletic Association (CAA). Bryant is playing football in the Big South Conference in 2022, the final season before the Big South and Ohio Valley Conference (OVC) merge their football leagues.
 The Atlantic 10 Conference has seven football-sponsoring members:
 Davidson and Dayton play in the PFL.
 Duquesne plays in the Northeast Conference (NEC).
 Fordham plays in the Patriot League.
 Rhode Island and Richmond play in CAA Football.
 UMass plays FBS football as an independent.
 The current Big East Conference has four football-sponsoring schools. Three play in FCS—Butler in the PFL, Georgetown in the Patriot League, and Villanova in CAA Football. The fourth, UConn, plays as an FBS independent.
 Three Big West Conference members have football programs. UC Davis and Cal Poly play FCS football in the Big Sky Conference, and Hawaiʻi plays FBS football in the Mountain West Conference. 
 The Horizon League has two football schools. Robert Morris plays Big South football and Youngstown State plays in the Missouri Valley Football Conference (MVFC). Barring any further realignment, Robert Morris will move to the new football league to be formed in 2023 when the Big South and OVC merge their football leagues.
 The Metro Atlantic Athletic Conference (MAAC) has one football school, with Marist playing in the PFL.
 The Missouri Valley Conference has eight football schools—Drake, Illinois State, Indiana State, Missouri State, Murray State, Northern Iowa, Southern Illinois and Valparaiso. Drake and Valparaiso play in the PFL; all others except Murray State compete in the MVFC (a separate legal entity from the MVC, despite the similar name). Murray State is playing the 2022 football season in its former full-time home of the OVC before joining the MVFC in 2023.
 The Summit League has six football schools, five of which play in the MVFC—North Dakota, North Dakota State, South Dakota, South Dakota State and Western Illinois. The sixth, St. Thomas of Minnesota, plays in the PFL.
 The West Coast Conference has two football schools in BYU and San Diego, which respectively play football as an FBS independent and a PFL member. BYU will leave the WCC and the FBS independent ranks in 2023 when it joins the Big 12 Conference.

The following Division I conferences do not sponsor football. These conferences still compete in Division I for all sports that they sponsor.

Conferences

Notes

Of these, the two that most recently sponsored football were the Atlantic 10 and MAAC. The A-10 football league dissolved in 2006 with its members going to CAA Football, the technically separate football league operated by the all-sports Colonial Athletic Association. In addition, four A-10 schools (Dayton, Fordham, Duquesne, and Massachusetts) play football in a conference other CAA Football, which still includes two full-time A-10 members (Rhode Island and Richmond). The MAAC stopped sponsoring football in 2007, after most of its members gradually stopped fielding teams. Among current MAAC members that were in the conference before 2007, only Marist, which plays in the Pioneer Football League, still sponsors football.

From 2013 to 2021, the Western Athletic Conference was a non-football league, having dropped football after a near-complete membership turnover that saw the conference stripped of all but two of its football-sponsoring members. The two remaining football-sponsoring schools, Idaho and New Mexico State, played the 2013 season as FBS independents before becoming football-only members of the Sun Belt Conference in 2014. Both left Sun Belt football in 2018, with Idaho downgrading to FCS status and adding football to its all-sports Big Sky Conference membership and New Mexico State becoming an FBS independent. The WAC added two more football-sponsoring schools with the 2020 arrival of Tarleton and Utah Tech (then Dixie State) from Division II; both schools planned to be FCS independents for the foreseeable future. The WAC would reinstate football at the FCS level in 2021, coinciding with the arrival of four new members with FCS football; for its first season, it entered into a formal partnership with the ASUN Conference to give it enough playoff-eligible members to receive an automatic playoff berth. This partnership was renewed for the 2022 season, with five ASUN and three WAC schools participating, though each conference will play its own schedule. After the 2022 season, the ASUN and WAC announced a full football merger for 2023 and beyond.

Division I in ice hockey

Some sports, most notably ice hockey and men's volleyball, have completely different conference structures that operate outside of the normal NCAA sports conference structure.

As ice hockey is limited to a much smaller number of almost exclusively Northern schools, there is a completely different conference structure for teams. These conferences feature a mix of teams that play their other sports in various Division I conferences, and even Division II and Division III schools. For most of the early 21st century, there was no correlation between a team's ice hockey affiliation and its affiliation for other sports, with the exception of the Ivy League's hockey-playing schools all being members of the ECAC. For example, before 2013, the Hockey East men's conference consisted of one ACC school, one Big East school, four schools from the America East, one from the A-10, one CAA school, and two schools from the D-II Northeast-10 Conference, while the Central Collegiate Hockey Association (CCHA) and Western Collegiate Hockey Association (WCHA) both had some Big Ten representation, plus Division II and III schools. Also, the divisional structure is truncated, with the Division II championship abolished in 1999.

The Metro Atlantic Athletic Conference ceased its sponsorship of the sport in 2003, with the remaining members forming Atlantic Hockey. For the next decade, no regular all-sport conferences sponsored ice hockey.

Starting with the 2013–14 season, Division I men's hockey experienced a major realignment. The Big Ten Conference began to sponsor ice hockey, and their institutions withdrew their membership from the WCHA and CCHA. Additionally, six other schools from those conferences withdrew to form the new National Collegiate Hockey Conference at the same time. The fallout from these moves led to the demise of the original CCHA, two more teams entering the NCHC, and further membership turnover in the men's side of the WCHA.

Women's hockey was largely unaffected by this realignment. The Big Ten still has only four members with varsity women's hockey (full members Michigan and Michigan State only ice men's teams, as does hockey-only member Notre Dame), with six teams required under conference bylaws for official sponsorship. As a result, the only changes in women's hockey affiliations in the 2010–14 period occurred in College Hockey America, which saw two schools drop the sport and three new members join.

The next significant realignment took place after the 2020–21 season, when seven of the 10 then-current men's members of the WCHA left to form a revived CCHA, which in turn led to the demise of the men's side of the WCHA.

Conferences

Notes

Classification debate
In the early 21st century, a controversy arose in the NCAA over whether schools will continue to be allowed to have one showcased program in Division I with the remainder of the athletic program in a lower division, as is the case of, notably, Johns Hopkins University lacrosse as well as Colorado College and University of Alabama in Huntsville in ice hockey. This is an especially important issue in hockey, which has no Division II national championship and has several schools whose other athletic programs compete in Division II and Division III.

This controversy was resolved at the 2004 NCAA Convention in Nashville, Tennessee when the members supported Proposal 65–1, the amended legislation co-sponsored by Colorado College, Clarkson University, Hartwick College, the Johns Hopkins University, Rensselaer Polytechnic Institute, Rutgers University–Newark, St. Lawrence University, and SUNY Oneonta. Each school affected by this debate is allowed to grant financial aid to student-athletes who compete in Division I programs in one men's sport and one women's sport. It is still permitted for other schools to place one men's and one women's sport in Division I going forward, but they cannot offer scholarships without bringing the whole program into compliance with Division I rules. In addition, schools in Divisions II and III are allowed to "play up" in any sport that does not have a championship for the school's own division, but only Division II programs and any Division III programs covered by the exemption can offer scholarships in those sports.

Five Division I programs at "waiver schools" were grandfathered with the passing of Proposal 65-1:

 Clarkson University – men's and women's ice hockey
 Colorado College – men's ice hockey, women's soccer
 Johns Hopkins University – men's and women's lacrosse
 Rensselaer Polytechnic Institute – men's ice hockey (women's ice hockey moved up to Division I in 2005)
 St. Lawrence University – men's and women's ice hockey
An additional three programs were grandfathered in Proposal 65-1 but no longer are sponsored in Division I:

 Hartwick College – men's soccer, women's water polo (men's soccer dropped to Division III in 2018, with women's water polo discontinued at the same time)
 Rutgers University–Newark – men's volleyball (dropped to Division III in 2014)
 SUNY Oneonta – men's soccer (dropped to Division III in 2006)

See also
 List of NCAA Division I institutions
 List of NCAA Division I athletic directors
 List of current NCAA Division I champions
 List of NCAA Divisions II and III schools competing in NCAA Division I sports
 List of schools reclassifying their athletic programs to NCAA Division I
 Progress toward degree

References

External links